Khalsa College of Law or KCL is a private law school situated beside Ram Tirath Road in Amritsar in the Indian state of Punjab. It offers 5 year Integrated B.A. LL.B., B.Com LL.B. and 3 years Law courses approved by Bar Council of India (BCI), New Delhi and affiliated to Guru Nanak Dev University.

History
Khalsa College of Law was established in 2012 and run by Khalsa College Charitable Society of Amritsar which was founded in 1892.

References

Law schools in Punjab, India
Educational institutions established in 2012
2012 establishments in Punjab, India
Education in Amritsar